Jerrold Seigel is a prominent American historian. He is Professor Emeritus at New York University. He taught for twenty-five years at Princeton University. His book Modernity and Bourgeois Life: Society, Politics and Culture in England, France, and Germany since 1750 (2012), won the 2014 Laura Shannon Prize for "the best book in European studies that transcends a focus on any one country, state, or people to stimulate new ways of thinking about contemporary Europe as a whole." He has been called "one of the greatest practitioners of intellectual history in our time" and sits on the editorial board of the Journal of the History of Ideas.

Bibliography
 Marx's Fate: The Shape of a Life (Princeton University Press, 1978)
 Bohemian Paris: Culture, Politics, and the Boundaries of Bourgeois Life, 1830-1930 (Viking, 1986)
 The Private Worlds of Marcel Duchamp: Desire, Liberation, and the Self in Modern Culture (University of California Press, 1995) 
 The Idea of the Self: Thought and Experience in Western Europe since the Seventeenth Century (Cambridge University Press, 2005).
 Modernity and Bourgeois Life: Society, Politics and Culture in England, France, and Germany since 1750 (Cambridge University Press, 2012)
 Between Cultures: Europe and Its Others in Five Exemplary Lives (Penn Press, 2015)

References

External links
 "Indiscretions of the Bourgeoise", review of Bohemian Paris: Culture, Politics, and the Boundaries of Bourgeois Life, 1830-1930 (1986) in New York Times
 The Idea of Self: Thought and Experience in Western Europe since the Seventeenth Century (2005)

20th-century American historians
20th-century American male writers
21st-century American historians
21st-century American male writers
American male non-fiction writers